The 2008 Volta a la Comunitat Valenciana was a road cycling stage race that took place in the Valencian Community between 26 February and 1 March 2008. The race was won by Rubén Plaza.

Stages

Teams 

Standings

General classification

Points classification

Mountains classification

Combativity award

Team classification

Classification Leadership

References 

2008
2008 UCI Europe Tour
2008 in Spanish road cycling